Brooks High School (BHS) is a public high school in Killen, Alabama, United States. It was established in 1908 and is part of the Lauderdale County Schools district.

History 
The first Killen school was built in 1908 on what is now Jones Avenue and was moved to the present site of Brooks Elementary School in 1935. The tradition of Brooks High School began with the 1968–1969 school year, during which Brooks had an enrollment of 325 students in grades seven through 10. The modern school's enrollment is around 780 students in grades seven through 12.

Notable alumni 
Patrick Hape, former NFL tight end

Shonna Tucker, singer-songwriter and former bassist for Drive-By Truckers

Freddie Roach, football star and current assistant football coach for The University of Alabama

Notable staff 
 Harlon Hill, taught here and became principal after his NFL career.

References

External links 
 
 

Public high schools in Alabama
Schools in Lauderdale County, Alabama
Public middle schools in Alabama
Educational institutions established in 1908
1908 establishments in Alabama